Albert Edward James Rowles (born 10 March 1951) is an English former footballer.

Career
Rowles started his career with Bournemouth & Boscombe Athletic in March 1968. He joined York City in July 1971. He was York's top scorer for the 1972–73 season, with a total of 9 goals. He joined Torquay United in June 1973 and was top scorer in his first season. He then moved to Darlington in August 1975 and was top scorer in the 1976–1977 season. He left to join Colchester United in December 1977.

References

1951 births
Living people
People from Gosport
English footballers
Association football midfielders
AFC Bournemouth players
York City F.C. players
Torquay United F.C. players
Darlington F.C. players
Colchester United F.C. players